Marek Bakoš (born 15 April 1983) is a former Slovak footballer who played as a forward.

Club career
Bakoš made his first football steps in his hometown club ŠK Nová Baňa. When he was 15 he moved to Nitra where he made his debut at senior level. After 5 seasons in Nitra he was transferred to Matador Púchov in July 2003. In his first season for Púchov he scored 9 goals and 8 goals in the next season. In January 2006, he signed for the Russian Premier League club Shinnik. He played only 2 matches in his first Shinnik season. The club ended last in the 2006 season and was relegated to the First Division. There he scored 3 goals in 20 matches and then came back on Slovakia, signing for Ružomberok in July 2007. He scored 16 goals for two seasons in Ružomberok. Czech manager Pavel Vrba brought Bakoš to Viktoria Plzeň in June 2009. He knew him from Púchov. Bakoš scored his first goal for Plzeň in his second match against Slovan Liberec. In 2010–11, he helped win the first Czech title ever for Plzeň, scoring 9 goals. He scored 6 goals in 5 qualifying matches for the 2011–12 UEFA Champions League. On 13 September 2011, Bakoš scored the first UEFA Champions League group stage goal in Viktoria Plzeň's history in a 1–1 home draw against Belarusian club BATE Borisov. On 23 November 2011, he netted the only goal in the away match against BATE Borisov to enable his team to claim its first group stage win and almost assure its progression into the UEFA Europa League as the third best team in the group. He helped Slovan Liberec win the Czech Cup in 2014–15  and scored in the final.

Career statistics 
As of 17 May 2016

International career
Bakoš made his debut for the senior national team of his country on 29 February 2012 as a starter in the 2–1 away win over Turkey in a friendly match.

Honours

Club
 Plzeň
Czech First League (3): 2010–11, 2012–13, 2014–15
Czech Cup (1): 2009–10
Czech Republic Football Supercup (1): 2011

 Liberec
Czech Cup (1): 2014–15

International
UEFA European Under-19 Football Championship: Third place (2002)

Notes

References

External links
Viktoria Plzeň profile 

1983 births
Living people
Association football forwards
Slovak footballers
Slovakia youth international footballers
Slovakia under-21 international footballers
FC Nitra players
MŠK Púchov players
FC Shinnik Yaroslavl players
MFK Ružomberok players
FC Viktoria Plzeň players
Slovak Super Liga players
Russian Premier League players
Czech First League players
Slovak expatriate footballers
Expatriate footballers in Russia
Expatriate footballers in the Czech Republic
Slovak expatriate sportspeople in Russia
Slovak expatriate sportspeople in the Czech Republic
FC Slovan Liberec players
Slovakia international footballers
FC Spartak Trnava players
People from Žarnovica District
Sportspeople from the Banská Bystrica Region